The South Korean honors system includes orders of merit, medals of honor, and commendations conferred by the South Korean government onto its citizens and foreigners.

Orders and medals
Orders of merit and medals of honor are given by the president of South Korea to people who "rendered distinguished services" to the country. The first honor, the Grand Order of Mugunghwa, was established in 1949.

Orders of Merit 
 Grand Order of Mugunghwa 
 Order of Merit for National Foundation 
 Order of Civil Merit 
 Order of Military Merit 
 Order of Service Merit 
 Order of National Security Merit 
 Order of Diplomatic Service Merit 
 Order of Industrial Service Merit 
 Order of Saemaeul Service Merit 
 Order of Cultural Merit 
 Order of Sports Merit 
 Order of Science and Technology Merit

Medals of Honor and Presidential Medals 
 National Foundation Medal
 Civil Merit Medal
 Military Merit Medal
 Service Merit Medal
 National Security Medal
 Reserve Forces Medal
 Diplomatic Service Medal
 Industrial Service Medal
 Sarmaeul Service Medal
 Cultural Merit Medal
 Sports Merit Medal
 Science and Technology Medal
 Talent Medal of Korea (No longer awarded)

Commendations 
Commendations are given to people by the president of South Korea, prime minister of South Korea, or various government ministries in recognition of acts of public service or excellence in certain fields.

Presidential Commendation 
 Presidential Commendation
 Republic of Korea Presidential Unit Citation

Prime Ministerial and Ministerial Medal

by the Prime Minister and same leveled organizations 
 Prime Minister's Commendation
 Exemplary Public Official Medal
 Chairperson of National Election Commission's Commendation

Ministerial Commendations 
 Ministerial Commendations
 Ministerial Medals

by the Minister of National Defense 
 Korean War Service Medal
 Medal for Participation in Vietnam War (No longer awarded)
 Gulf War Participation Medal (No longer awarded)
 Medal for 10 Years Faithful Service 
 Medal for 20 Years Faithful Service 
 Medal for 30 Years Faithful Service
 Guerrilla Service Medal
 Overseas Peacekeeping Medal
 10th Anniversary of Republic of Korea Army Medal (No longer awarded)
 20th Anniversary of Republic of Korea Army Medal (No longer awarded)
 30th Anniversary of Republic of Korea Army Medal (No longer awarded)
 40th Anniversary of Republic of Korea Army Medal (No longer awarded)

by the Commissioner General of the National Police Agency 
 Police 20 Years Long Service Medal

Titles
 New Knowledge Worker of Korea
 New Knowledge Farmer of Korea
 Korean Master Hand

See also 
 Orders, decorations, and medals of the Korean Empire
 Orders, decorations, and medals of North Korea

References

External links

 Guide to the South Korean honors system (in Korean)
 List of South Korean honors recipients (in Korean)
 The Orders, Medals and Decorations of Korea